The MON-200 is a directional type anti-personnel mine designed and manufactured in Soviet Union. It is an enlarged version of the MON-100 mine.

Because of its large size, this directional blast mine can also be used against light-skinned vehicles and helicopters.

Specifications
 Mine type: Anti-personnel 
 Mine action:  
 Material: Sheet metal
 Shape: Circular 
 Colour: Green, olive 
 Total weight: 25 kg
 Explosive content: 12 kg TNT 
 Operating pressure (kg):  
 Length: n/a
 Width: 130 mm
 Height: n/a 
 Diameter: 434 mm

See also
MON-100

Area denial weapons
Cold War weapons of the Soviet Union
Anti-personnel mines
Land mines of the Soviet Union